Avi Ostrowsky is an Israeli musician and conductor.

Biography
Avi Ostrowsky was born in 1939 in Israel. 

Studied in the Rubin Music Academy in Tel Aviv and Academy for Music and performing arts in Vienna. 

Main Activities – Israel, Europe, America

In his youth Avi Ostrowsky was member of a youth movement, planned to live in a Kibbutz. Therefore went to study mechanics profession. During his studies he was attracted to music and formed a choir whose members guided without any knowledge of musical notes and music theory. At the age of 17 he met conductor Gary Bertini and with his encouragement studied for two years at the Music Teachers College in Tel Aviv. He then went on to study conducting and composition at the Rubin Music Academy in Tel Aviv with Maestro Gary Bertini and Professor Mordechai Seter. 
During his studies Avi Ostrowsky worked as a mechanic in a garage to finance his music studies. When he enlisted in the army, Maestro Bertini asked that he be placed as his successor in the formation of the Army Choir. Upon graduation and after graduating from the army, Ostrowsky joined as a member of Kibbutz Lahav. In 1965 Ostrowsky was appointed music director and conductor of the "Kol Israel Radio Choir" in Jerusalem. In 1966 he received a scholarship from the America-Israel Cultural Foundation which allowed him to study with the renowned Professor Hans Swarowsky at the Academy of Music and Performing Arts in Vienna. While studying in Vienna his talent was recognized by his teachers which permitted him to complete a four-year program in just two years, in 1968. He also studied with Maestro Franco Ferrara in Italy. In May 1968, while still a student in Vienna, Ostrowsky won the first price at the Nikolai Malko Competition for young conductors in Copenhagen. Following this success he received invitations to conduct many orchestras around the world.

Music career 
 
In 1968, before returning to Israel from his studies in Vienna, Ostrowsky received and accepted the invitation from the renowned musician Frank Peleg and was appointed music director and permanent conductor of the Haifa Symphony Orchestra in Israel. In 1970 he established the Israel Netanya Kibbutz Orchestra and was its music director and permanent conductor. In 1973 he founded the Israel Sinfonietta Beer Sheva and directed it until 1978 when he was named music director and permanent conductor of the Antwerp Philharmonic Orchestra. In 1989 he was elected music director and permanent conductor of the Norwegian Radio Symphony Orchestra in Oslo. In 1998 Ostrowsky was asked by the management of the Israel Netanya Kibbutz Orchestra to return and serve again as the music director and permanent conductor.

Ostrowsky has conducted many well known orchestras in Israel and around the world. 
In Israel he has conducted the Israel Philharmonic Orchestra, the Jerusalem Symphony Orchestra, the Israel Rishon Lezion Symphony Orchestra, the Israel Camerata Jerusalem, the Israel Chamber Orchestra, the Raanana Symphony Orchestra and more.
Around the world Ostrowsky has conducted many orchestras. Among others: London Philharmonic Orchestra, London Symphony Orchestra,  Philharmonia Orchestra, Royal Philharmonic Orchestra, BBC Philharmonic Orchestra, Mariinsky Opera Orchestra in St. Petersburg, St. Petersburg Symphony Orchestra, Amsterdam Philharmonic, Brussels Philharmonic, Belgian National Symphony Orchestra, Cologne Radio Symphony Orchestra  in Germany, Stuttgart Philharmonic, Vienna Symphony Orchestra, Lamoureux Orchestra in Paris, Bordeaux National Symphony Orchestra, Nice Opera house in France, La Fenice Opera House in Venice, Oslo Philharmonic, Gothenburg Symphony Orchestra in Sweden, Malmo Symphony Orchestra, Danish Radio Symphony Orchestra in Copenhagen, Zagreb Philharmonic, Mexico Philharmonic, Ofunam Philharmonic in Mexico, and more. 
He has also conducted many opera productions at various opera houses around the world. 

Ostrowsky has toured with different orchestras around the world, including the London Philharmonic Orchestra while touring Australia, the Malmo Symphony Orchestra in Sweden, the Stuttgart Philharmonic Orchestra around Germany, and more.

He recorded many concerts that were transferred to CDs and DVDs, including works by Mozart, Beethoven, Berlioz, Schubert, Brahms, Dvorak, Tchaikovsky, Mahler, Prokofiev, Shostakovich, Stravinsky, and many more.

Selected recordings
 Igor Stravinsky – The Rite of Spring (Le Sacre du Printemps), Petrushka, Firebird, Psalm Symphony.
 Shostakovich – Symphonies 1, 5, 6, 7, 8, 9, 10, 14, 15.
 Karol Szymanowski – Stabet Mater. 
 Gustav Mahler – Symphonies 1, 2, 3, 4, 5, 6, 9.
 Johannes Brahms – Symphonies 1, 2, 3,  4, Ein Deutsches Requiem.
 Dvorak – Stabat Mater, Requiem
 Hector Berlioz – Symphonie Fantastique, Messe Solennelle. 
 Franz Schubert – Symphonies 4, 8 "Unfinished", 9.
 Ludwig van Beethoven – Symphony No.3 "Eroica", Symphony No.7.
 Wolfgang Amadeus Mozart – Requiem, Great Mass in C minor K.427, Missa Solemnis in C minor K.139.

See also
Music of Israel

References 

Ortowsky, Avi
University of Music and Performing Arts Vienna alumni
Living people
21st-century conductors (music)
Year of birth missing (living people)